Jacco Van Duyn is a Dutch former professional tennis player.

Van Duyn began competing on the professional tour during the late 1980s and reached a career best singles ranking of 264, in a career which included qualifying draw appearances at the French and US Opens. As a doubles player he featured in an ATP Tour main draw at the 1991 Athens Open and won the Santiago Challenger tournament in 1992.

ATP Challenger titles

Doubles: (1)

References

External links
 
 

Year of birth missing (living people)
Living people
Dutch male tennis players